Iuliia Batenkova-Bauman (also spelled Yuliia, Yuliya, Yulia, or Julia; born 20 September 1983) is a Ukrainian Nordic skier who competes in cross-country skiing and biathlon. She has competed in three successive Winter Paralympics, where she has won 13 silver and bronze medals.

Career
Batenkova was born on 20 September 1983, in Simferopol, Crimea, Ukrainian Soviet Socialist Republic. As a child, she took part in artistic gymnastics. At the age of 8, she was in a road traffic accident where her mother and brother died, and Batenkova lost her right hand. Because of the injury, she gave up gymnastics. Together with her father, she moved to Kovel, where he remarried. Batenkova graduated from school with a qualification in accounting, and during her studies she was introduced to the Foundation for Supporting Sports for the Handicapped. She took part in track and field events at first, but seeking to go to the Paralympic Games, she switched to winter sports due to heavy competition for spots in the summer events. She studied at the Open International University of Human Development "Ukraine".

Batenkova has competed at three successive Winter Paralympics, first at Turin 2006, and also in 2010 and 2014. She has won medals at each games in both Cross-country skiing and biathlon. Following the Turin Games, Batenkova was given an apartment in Lutsk by the Ukrainian Government, and has been given other financial awards for winning her medals at the three Winter Paralympics she has attended. During the 2014 Winter Paralympics closing ceremony, Batenkova was one of the Ukrainian medallists who covered their medals in protest against the annexation of Crimea by the Russian Federation. She said afterwards, "That is how we show our protest and disagreement that our country could be divided and part of it could be excluded from Ukraine, Crimea is my motherland, where I was born, and of course I worry about it. I want peace."

She won the bronze medal in the women's 6km standing biathlon event at the 2021 World Para Snow Sports Championships held in Lillehammer, Norway.

References

External links 
 

Living people
1983 births
Ukrainian female cross-country skiers
Ukrainian female biathletes
Cross-country skiers at the 2006 Winter Paralympics
Cross-country skiers at the 2010 Winter Paralympics
Cross-country skiers at the 2014 Winter Paralympics
Cross-country skiers at the 2018 Winter Paralympics
Biathletes at the 2006 Winter Paralympics
Biathletes at the 2010 Winter Paralympics
Biathletes at the 2014 Winter Paralympics
Biathletes at the 2018 Winter Paralympics
Paralympic cross-country skiers of Ukraine
Paralympic biathletes of Ukraine
Paralympic silver medalists for Ukraine
Paralympic bronze medalists for Ukraine
Medalists at the 2006 Winter Paralympics
Medalists at the 2010 Winter Paralympics
Medalists at the 2014 Winter Paralympics
People from Kovel
Paralympic medalists in cross-country skiing
Paralympic medalists in biathlon
21st-century Ukrainian women